The action of 22 August 1866 occurred during the Chincha Islands War near Funchal, on the island of Madeira, and was the final action of the war battle between Spanish and Chilean forces.

The Chilean steamer  was captured by the Spanish frigate Gerona, on 22 August 1866 off the island of Madeira. Tornado had arrived in Madeira under the command of Juan MacPherson, an English commander in service of the Chilean Navy. The Chilean ship had sailed to Madeira on 21 August to make provisions of charcoal and food supplements and to recruit sailors for its crew. Although the intent was to remain until 23 August, at 14:00 hours on 22 August the watch aboard ship alerted the captain to the presence of an armed vessel, the Spanish frigate Gerona. Captain McPherson decided to leave all his supplies on the dock and got the ship underway 90 minutes after the first sighting of Gerona. In its haste, Tornado had not been inspected by or granted permission to leave port from the Portuguese authorities in Madeira. Two blank charges were fired to signal that Tornado should stop, but Tornado continued out of port.

Gerona had been sent from Cádiz under the command of captain Benito Ruiz de la Escalera specifically to capture Tornado and its sister ship, Cyclone. The firing of the charges alerted Gerona of the presence of Tornado and Gerona gave chase. At 22:30 Gerona fired a blank shot. Tornado continued to ignore the intent. Gerona followed up with three live shots; Tornado stopped its engines and struck its colors.

The crew of Tornado was transferred to Gerona. Tornado was manned by a prize crew commanded by naval lieutenant Manuel de Bustillo y Pery. Tornado sailed for Cádiz, where it arrived on 26 August, while Gerona returned to Madeira in a fruitless search for Tornados sister ship Cyclone.

Aftermath
The captured Tornado was subsequently taken into the Spanish service under the same name.

Notes

Conflicts in 1866
1866 in Chile
Naval battles involving Spain
Naval battles involving Chile
Battles of the Chincha Islands War
August 1866 events